Yelan is a rural locality (a selo) in Kabansky District, Republic of Buryatia, Russia. The population was 423 as of 2010. There are 7 streets.

Geography 
Yelan is located 9 km north of Kabansk (the district's administrative centre) by road. Nyuki is the nearest rural locality.

References 

Rural localities in Kabansky District